The following is a list of works by American dime novel author Edward Zane Carroll Judson commonly known by his pen name Ned Buntline.

Dime novels
 Magdalena, the Beautiful Mexican Maid: A Story of Buena Vista. New York: Williams Bros, 1846.  
 The Curse!: A Tale of Crime and Its Retribution, Founded on Facts of Real Life. Boston: Roberts & Garfield, 1847.  
 Bellamira; Or, the Last Days of Callao: An Historical Romance of Peru. Boston: Star Spangled Banner Office, 1847. 
 The Volunteer: Or, the Maid of Monterey: a Tale of the Mexican War. Boston: F. Gleason, 1847.  
 The Black Avenger of the Spanish Main, Or, the Fiend of Blood: A Thrilling Story of the Buccaneer Times. Boston: Gleason, 1847.  
 Matanzas; Or, a Brother's Revenge: A Tale of Florida. Boston: G.H. Williams, 1848.  
 Love's Desperation, Or, the President's Only Daughter: And Other Tales. Boston: F. Gleason, 1848.  
 Cruisings, Afloat and Ashore: From the Private Log of Ned Buntline Sketches of Land and Sea, Humorous and Pathetic, Tragical and Comical. New York: R. Craighead, 1848.  
 The Red Revenger, Or, the Pirate King of the Floridas; a Romance of the Gulf and Its Islands. Boston: F. Gleason, Flag of Our Union Office, 1848.  
 The Ice King, Or, the Fate of the Lost Steamer: A Fanciful Tale of the Far North. Boston: George H. Williams, 1848.  
 The King of the Sea: Tale of the Fearless and Free. New York: Samuel French, 1848.  

 Love at First Sight, Or, the Daguerreotype: A Romantic Story of Real Life. Boston: Jone's Pub. House, 1849.  
 Three Years After: A Sequel to the Mysteries and Miseries of New York. New York: Burgess, 1849.  
 Working Men, Shall Americans or English Rule in This City?. New York, 1849.  
 The B'hoys of New York: A Sequel to the Mysteries and Miseries of New York. New York: Dick & Fitzgerald, 1850.  
 The G'hals of New York: A Novel. New York: Dewitt and Davenport, 1850.  
 The Virgin of the Sun: A Historical Romance of the Last Revolution in Peru. London: Newman, 1850.  
 The Mysteries and Miseries of New York: A Story of Real Life. New York: Dick & Fitzgerald, 1851.  
 The White Cruiser, Or, the Fate of the Unheard-of: A Tale of Land and Sea: of Crime and Mystery. New York: Garrett, 1853.  
 The Wheel of Misfortune; Or, the Victims of Lottery and Policy Dealers: A Yarn from the Web of New York Life. New York: Garrett & Co, 1853.  
 The Jesuit's Daughter: A Novel for Americans to Read. New York: Burgess & Day, 1854.  
 The Mysteries and Miseries of New Orleans. Philadelphia: T.B. Peterson & Bros, 1854.  
 The Pale Lily; Or, the Young Bride's Honey Moon: A Tale of Border Life and Savage Cruelty. New York: Garrett & Co, 1855.  
 The Queen of the Sea; Or, Our Lady of the Ocean: A Tale of Love and Chivalry. Novelette. 1855.  
 The Red Right Hand: A Tale of Indian Warfare. New York: Dick & Fitzgerald, 1857.  
 Luona Prescott, Or, the Curse Fulfilled: A Tale of the American Revolution. New York, 1858.  
 Thayendanegea, the Scourge: Or, the Wareagle of the Mohawks : a Tale of Mystery, Ruth, and Wrong. New York: F.A. Brady, 1858.  
 The Shell-Hunter: Or, an Ocean Love-Chase, a Romance of Land and Sea. New York: F.A. Brady, 1858.  
 English Tom: Or, the Smuggler's Secret: a Tale of Ship and Shore. New York: F.A. Brady, 1858.  
 The White Wizard: Or, the Great Prophet of the Seminoles: a Tale of Strange Mystery in the South and North. New York: F.A. Brady, 1858.  
 Our Mess: Or, the Pirate-Hunters of the Gulf: a Tale of Naval Heroism and Wild Adventure in the Tropics. New York: F.A. Brady, 1859.  
 Seawaif: Or, the Terror of the Coast: a Tale of Privateering in 1776. New York: F.A. Brady, 1859.  
 Ned Buntline's Life Yarn. New York: Dick & Fitzgerald, 1860.  
 Saul Sabberday; or the Idiot Spy. New York: Brady, 1860.  
 Stella Delorme, Or, the Comanche's Dream: A Wild and Fanciful Story of Savage Chivalry. New York: F.A. Brady, 1860.  
 Norwood; Or, Life on the Prairie. New York: Dick & Fitzergald, 1860.  
 Elfrida, the Red Rover's Daughter: A New Mystery of New York. New York: F.A. Brady, 1860.  
 Morgan, Or, the Knight of the Black Flag: A Strange Story of By-Gone Times. New York: F.A. Brady, 1861.  
 The Man-O'-War's-Man's Grudge: A Romance of the Revolution. New York: F.A. Brady, 1861.  
 The Death-Mystery: A Crimson Tale of Life in New York. New York: F.A. Brady, 1861.  
 Hilliare Henderson, Or, the Secret Revealed: An Antecedent to "The Death Mystery". New York: F.A. Brady, 1862.  
 Ella Adams: Or, the Demon of Fire : a Tale of the Charleston Conflagration. New York: F.A. Brady, 1862.  
 The Grossbeak Mansion: A Mystery of New York. New York: F.A. Brady, 1862.  
 The Last of the Buccaneers: A Yarn of the Eighteenth Century. New York: Dick & Fitzgerald, 1863.  
 The Convict, Or, the Conspirators' Victim: A Novel Written in Prison. New York: Dick & Fitzgerald, 1863.  
 The Scourge of the Seas, Or, the Outlaw's Bride. New York: George Munro, 1864.  
 Sadia: a Heroine of the Rebellion. New York: F.A. Brady, 1864.  
 Netta Bride; Or, the King of the Vultures. New York, 1864.  
 Mermet Ben, Or, the Astrologer King: A Story of Magic and Wonderful Illusions. New York: Hilton, 1865.  
 Clara St. John, Or, the Mystery Solved: A Sequel to Mermet Ben. New York, 1865.  
 The Parricides; or the Doom of the Assassins, the Authors of a Nation's Loss. A Tale Based on the Assassination of Abraham Lincoln. New York: Hilton & Co, 1865.  
 The Battle of Hate, Or, Hearts Are Trumps. New York: F.A. Brady, 1865.  
 Rose Seymour, Or, the Ballet Girl's Revenge: A Tale of the New-York Drama. New York: Hilton, 1865.  
 Wealth and Beauty, Or, the Temptations of City Life. , 1865.  
 Netta Bride: And the Poor of New York. New York, 1865.  
 The War-Eagle or the Scourge of the Mohawks. New York, 1865.  
 The Rattlesnake: Or, the Rebel Privateer: A Tale of the Present Time. New York: Frederic A. Brady, 1865.  
 The Beautiful Nun. Philadelphia: T.B. Peterson, 1866.  
 Clarence Rhett: Or, the Cruise of a Privateer: an American Sea Story. New York: F.A. Brady, 1866.  
 Magdalena, the Outcast; Or, the Millionaire's Daughter: A Story of Life in the Empire City. New York: Hilton, 1866.  
 The Midnight Lamp, Or, Life in the Empire City. New York, 1866.  
 Mark Myrtle, the Maniac Hunter. New York, 1866.  
 Tiger-eye: A Story of Wild Adventure in the Backwoods. New York: G. Munro, 1866.  
 Old Nick of the Swamp; Or, the Bravo's Vengeance: A Story of Texas. New York: George Munro & Co, 1867.  
 Hawk-eye the Hunter: A Story of Western Life. New York: George Munro & Co, 1867.  
 Rosa, the Indian Captive: A Story of the Last War with England. New York: Hilton, 1867.  
 Templar's Chart Certificate of Membership. Greenpoint New York, 1867.  
(Buntline, Ned, Nathaniel, Orr.). Quaker Saul, The Idiot Spy, Or, Luliona, the Seminole: A Tale of Men and Deeds of '76. , 1869.  
 War-eagle ; Or, Ossiniwa, the Indian Brave. New York: DeWitt Publisher, 1869.  
 The Secret Vow; Or, the Power of Woman's Hate. New York: Beadle, 1870.  
 Miriam, Or, the Jew's Daughter: A Tale of City Life. New York: Dick & Fitzgerald, 1870.  
 Charley Bray; or the Fireman's Mission: The Story of a New York Fireman. New York: Trade publication, 1870.  
 Luona's Oath, Or, the Curse Fulfilled. New York, 1870.  
 Sib Cone, the Mountain Trapper. New York: Frank Starr, 1870.  
 Mad Anthony's Captain. New York: George Munro, 1872.  
 Texas Jack, The White King of the Pawnees, New York Weekly, Vol. XXVIII, No. 20, March 24 1872
 Agnes, Or, the Beautiful Milliner. New York: Advance Pub, 1874.  

 The Red Warrior, Or, Stella Delorme's Comanche Lover: A Romance of Savage Chivalry. New York: Frank Starr, 1874.  
 Red Ralph, the Ranger; or the Brother's Revenge. New York: F. Starr, 1875.  
 The Smuggler: Or, the Skipper's Crime: A Tale of Ship and Shore. New York: Frank Starr, 1875.  
 True As Steel, Or, the Faithful Sister. New York, 1876.  
 Old Zip's Cabin: Or, a Greenhorn in the Woods. New York: Beadle and Adams, 1878.  
 The Sea Bandit, Or, the Queen of the Isle: A Tale of the Antilles. New York: Frank Starr, 1879.  
 Buffalo Bill, the King of Border Men. New York: publisher not identified, 1881.  
 Andros, the Free Rover: Or, the Pirate's Daughter. New York: Beadle & Adams, 1883.  
 Texas Jack's Chums or, the Whirlwinds of the West. New York: The Nickle Library (Series 24, No. 643), 1883.
 Old Sib Cone, the Mountain Trapper. New York: Beadle and Adams, 1885.  
 Tombstone Dick, the Train Pilot, Or, the Traitor's Trail: A Story of the Arizonian Wilds. New York: Beadle & Adams, 1885.  
 Buffalo Bill: His Life and Stirring Adventures in the Wild West. London: G. Purkess, 1887.  
 Buffalo Bill's First Trail: Or, Will Cody, the Pony Express Rider. New York: M.J. Ivers, 1888.  
 The Black Privateer, Or, Cruise of the Cloud-Rift. New York: Camp-fire Library Co, 1888.  
 Shadowed and Trapped, Or, Harry the Sport. New York: Street & Smith, 1889.  
 Alf, the Chicago Sport. New York: Street & Smith, 1889.  
 The Miner Detective, Or, the Ghost of the Gulch. New York: Street & Smith, 1889.  
 Fire Feather, the Buccaneer King: A Tale of the Caribbean Sea. New York, 1890.  
 Orthodox Jeems: A Tale of Wild Adventure in the Black Hills. New York: Street & Smith, 1890.  
 Red Douglass, Or, the King of the Black Forest. New York: Street & Smith, 1890.  
 Hazel-eye, the Girl Trapper. New York: Street & Smith, 1890.  
 The Sea Spy. New York: Beadle & Adams, 1890.  
 Mountain Tom: A Story of the Diamond Fields. New York: Street & Smith, 1890.  
 Gulietta the Waif, Or, the Girl Wrecker. New York: Street & Smith, 1890.  
 Fritz's Old Score, Or, Sib Cone's Right Bower. New York, 1890.  
 Rover Wild, the Jolly Reefer. New York: Street & Smith, 1890.  
 Sensation Sate, the Queen of the Wild-Horse Range. New York: Street & Smith, 1890.  
 The Pearl of the Reef, Or, the Diver's Daughter. New York: Street & Smith, 1890.  
 The Witch of the Ocean, Or, the Lady of Silver Spray. New York: Street & Smith, 1891.  

 Buffalo Bill's Last Victory, Or, Dove Eye, the Lodge Queen. New York: Street & Smith, 1891.  
 'Silver Wing', the Angel of the Tribes. New York: Street & Smith, 1891.  
 Red Dick, the Tiger of California. New York: Street & Smith, 1891.  
 The Revenue Officer's Triumph; Or, the Sunken Treasure. New York: Street & Smith, 1891.  
 Long Tom, the Privateer. New York: Beadle & Adams, 1891.  
 Big Foot Wallace, the Giant Hero of the Border. New York: Street & Smith, 1891.  
 Buckskin Sam the Scalp-Taker. New York: Street & Smith, 1891.  
 Sam Ricketty, Or, a Well Planned Plot. New York, 1891.  
 Midwhipman [sic] Angus of H.m.s. Plantagenet, Or, the West Indian Sea Mystery. New York: Street & Smith, 1891.  
 Merciless Ben, the Hair-Lifter. New York: Street & Smith, 1891.  
 Bill Tredegar, the Moonshiner of Blue Ridge. New York: Street & Smith, 1895.  
 Dashing Charlie, the Texan Whirlwind. New York: Street & Smith, 1896.  
 Wild Bill's Last Trail. New York: Street and Smith, 1896.  
 Darrow, the Floating Detective, Or, the Shadowed Buccaneer: A Thrilling Ocean Story. New York: Street & Smith, 1896.  
 Wrestling Joe, the Dandy of the Mines, Or, the Crimson Trail of the Avenger. New York: Street & Smith, 1896.  
 Barnacle Backstay, Or, the Gray Eagle of the Atlantic. New York: Street & Smith, 1896.  
 Captain Jack, Or, the Seven Scouts. New York: Street & Smith, 1896.  
 Bill Tredegar, Or, the Outlaw of the Blue Ridge: A Story of the Secret Service. New York: Street & Smith, 1896.  
 Buffalo Bill's Best Shot. New York: Street & Smith, 1897.  
 The Ice-King, Or, Fate of the Lost Steamer: A Story of the Frozen North. New York, 1898.

Music lyrics
 Buntline, Ned and Woodbury, Isaac B. Capture of Monterey. Boston: Prentiss & Clark, 1847. 
 Buntline, Ned  and Woodbury, Isaac B. The Waving Plume: Song. Boston: E.H. Wade, 1847. 
 Buntline, Ned, J H. Johnson, and M G. Lewis. The Toper's Appeal: A Parody on the Maniac. Philadelphia, Pa.: J.H. Johnson, Song publisher, 1855.  
 Buntline, Ned and J H. Johnson. Sad Times: The Burning of the Steamboat New Jersey, on the Delaware, Night of March 15th, 1856. Sixty-Two Persons Hurried into Eternity by Water and by Fire. Philadelphia: Johnson's, No. 5 North Tenth Street, Philad, 1856.  
 The Philadelphia Girl's Lament!. Philadelphia: J.H. Johnson, Song publisher, 1856.  
 Buntline, Ned, and J R. Thomas. The Rainbow Temperance Song. New York: William A. Pond, 1868.

Plays
 The Scouts of the Prairie. Performed by the Buffalo Bill Combination, Chicago, Dec. 15 1872

References
Notes

Citations

Bibliography

External links
 

Bibliographies by writer
Bibliographies of American writers